Matthew Sean Leon (born January 30, 1991) is a Canadian rapper, singer, and record producer from Toronto, Ontario. He is the founder of the IXXI Initiative, formed in 2012 in Toronto. The collective helped foster the career of Daniel Caesar in tandem with producers Jordan Evans & Matthew Burnett.

Career
In July 2013, Leon released his debut mixtape Ninelevenne, the Tragedy followed by his second project Narcissus, the Drowning of Ego on January 22, 2014. Both projects featured production by Jordan Evans. Shortly after the release of Narcissus, Leon began the year-long roll out of the compilation King Of The Wild Things. followed with I Think You've Gone Mad (Or the Sins of the Father) in 2017. On November 29, 2017, Leon released an audio-film titled "C.C.W.M.T.T". 2018 had the release of the album Sean Leon (The Death Of) and in 2021 God's Algorithm which had a non-traditional album release, with no streaming service involved, and only available for purchase on a beta landing page where users interacted through visuals, audio files, NFTs, and apparel.

Following his appearance on Daniel Caesar's Pilgrim's Paradise EP,  in April 2016, Leon released the self-produced "Matthew in the Middle" featuring Caesar with production from Jovi, Jordan Evans and Jack Rochon, it was featured on the soundtrack for HBO's Insecure. Leon & Caesar's collaborations continued on the GRAMMY-nominated album Freudian & the following release Case Study 01. Leon also has released several WondaGurl-produced songs as well as working with fellow Toronto artists like River Tiber and Jazz Cartier.

In 2019, Leon had a demo titled "The Glade" under his own artist project. While working on Daniel Caesar's Case Study 01 in Los Angeles, fellow collaborator River Tiber recommended sharing the demo with Ye at one of West's Sunday Service performances. This led to Leon writing parts of "Selah", "Jesus Is Lord", the chorus on "Use This Gospel" and contributing to the track sequencing for West's 9th studio album Jesus Is King. The Glade became "Up from the Ashes" and was released on the deluxe edition release of West's album Donda, garnering him a co-writing and production credit on the track. He also was credited on Justin Bieber's song "Peaches". Leon has also been a guest writer for the TV series Utopia Falls.

Discography

Albums and mixtapes
 Ninelevenne, the Tragedy (2013)
 Narcissus, The Drowning of Ego (2014)
 King of the Wild Things (2014)
 I Think You've Gone Mad (Or the Sins of the Father) (2017)
 C.C.W.M.T.T. (2017)
 Sean Leon (The Death Of) (2018)
 God's Algorithm (2021)
 King & Sufferin (2022)
 HERD IMMUNITY (2022)

Singles
 "This Ain't 2012" (2015) (produced by WondaGurl)
 "81" (2015) (produced by Eestbound)
 "Europe Freestyle / I Made It / Debt & Vendettas" (feat. Savannah Ré) (2016) (produced by Sean Leon and Yogidaproducer (YOJO))
 "Deep End" (2016) (produced by WondaGurl)
 "Matthew in the Middle" (feat. Daniel Caesar) (2016) (produced by Sean Leon, Jovi, Jordan Evans and Jack Rochon)
 "Killin' Mind" (2016) (produced by Sean Leon, WondaGurl, MADEAT2AM and Jack Rochon)
 "Guard/God Up" (2016) (produced by WondaGurl)
 "Maui Slim II" (2016) (produced by Jordan Evans, Mike DZL, Jovi and Jack Rochon. Background vocals from Rachel Piscione and violin from Aaron Cheung)
 "Game 7 Flow / Court Tomorrow" (2016) (produced by DPAT)
 "Xxxcited (feat. Milly Manson)" (2016) (produced by Eestbound)
 "Fav Rapper / Hundred Million Religion" (2016) (produced by Bijan Amir)
 "Above the Rim" (2016) (featuring Jazz Cartier, produced by Wondagurl)
 "Charge It To The Wav" (2017) (produced by Eestbound)
 "Steve Harvey / Family Feud" (2017) (produced by WondaGurl and 2AM)
 "Tony Flamingo" (2017) (produced by Jandre Amos)
 "Sidelines" (2017) (produced by Eestbound and EDEEZ)
 "Gold" (2017) (produced by WondaGurl)
 "By Myself" (2017) (produced by Jandre Amos and Martin Sole)
 "Hollywood Tarantino Flow" (2017) (produced Jandre Amos, Taiyim and Sean Leon)
 "Loose" (feat. Jordan Fall) (2017) (produced by Jandre Amos)
 "Vintage" (2017) (produced by Eestbound and Bijan Amir)
 "Money Machine" (2018) (produced by Bluxz)
 "90 BPM" (2018) (produced by Harrison)
 "Breathe.Peace Sign" (2018) (produced by Eestbound)
 "DVP" (2018) (produced by Jack Rochon)
 "1:19" (2019) (produced by Eestbound)
 "Somewhere in Paris" (2019) (produced by Some-1ne & Eestbound)
 "Hi Life" (2019) (produced by SLWJMZ & Eestbound)
 "Gold Mouth" (2019) (produced by Eestbound)
 "Winner" (2019) (produced by Ikaz Boi & WondaGurl)
 "Waiting on Your Love" (2019) (produced by Eestbound)
 "Possessed" (2019) (produced by Eestbound)
 "Kesley Grammer" (2019) (produced by Eestbound)
 "SORRY!" (2019) (produced by Eestbound)
 "Guillotine" (2020) (produced by Jack Rochon)
 "Splash" (2020) (feat. Adrian Dey, Teddy Fantum, Ty Senoj, G Milla, Devontée Woe) [produced by Bijan Amir]
 "BURN EVERYTHING" (2022) (feat. Ye) [produced by Bijan Amir & John Cunningham]

Features
 Daniel Caesar's "Paradise" (2015)
 Ty Senoj's "Wheels" (2015)
 Daniel Caesar's "Freudian" (2017)
 Daniel Caesar's "Restore the Feeling" with Jacob Collier (2019)
 Junia T's "Tommy's Intro" with River Tiber & "Know Better" with Miloh Smith & Julian Thomas (2020)
 Ye's "Sci-Fi" from Donda 2

Songwriting
 Daniel Caesar's "Entropy" and "Frontal Lobe Muzik" (2019) contains additional vocals by Sean Leon
 Ye's "Selah", "Jesus Is Lord", and "Use This Gospel" (2019)
Ye's "Up From the Ashes" (2021)
 Justin Bieber's "Peaches" (2021)

References

External links
 

1991 births
Living people
Black Canadian musicians
Canadian male rappers
Canadian record producers
Rappers from Toronto
21st-century Canadian male musicians
21st-century Canadian rappers